SPAP may refer to:

Piraeus, Athens and Peloponnese Railways (Siderodromi Pireos Athinon Peloponisou), a meter-gauge railway network in southern Greece
Samodzielny Pododdział Antyterrorystyczny Policji, an independent anti-terrorist police subunits of the Polish police
Seaport-Airport Road, a proposed highway to Cochin International Airport, Kerala, India
Secure Password Authentication Protocol
Shiva Password Authentication Protocol
Socialist Popular Alliance Party, Egypt
Sodium-proton antiporter
State Prescription Assistance Program, a social program prescription assistance offered in U.S. states as part of Medicaid
Systolic pulmonary artery pressure (sPAP); see pulmonary hypertension